Mariala National Park is a national park in South West Queensland, Australia, 810 km west of Brisbane. Mariala lies within the Mulga Lands bioregion and the Shire of Quilpie local government area. It is located with the water catchment areas of the Bulloo, Paroo and Warrego rivers.

The park was part of the Ambathala pastoral holding which operated from 1875 until the early 1980s.  In 1982, the area became a scientific reserve, making it the first protected area to preserve part of Queensland's extensive Mulga Lands.  A decade later it was declared a national park.

A total of six rare or threatened species have been identified in the national park.  These include Major Mitchell's cockatoo and the rare square-tailed kite.

See also

 Protected areas of Queensland

References

National parks of Queensland
Protected areas established in 1992
1992 establishments in Australia
South West Queensland